McDonald Oden (born March 28, 1958) is a former American football tight end. He played for the Cleveland Browns from 1980 to 1982.

References

1958 births
Living people
American football tight ends
Tennessee State Tigers football players
Cleveland Browns players